Chakala is a locality in the suburb of Andheri in Mumbai. It had a station on the Salsette–Trombay Railway, which was dismantled after the rail line closed down in 1934. It is served by the Western Express Highway and Chakala stations on Line 1 of the Mumbai Metro.

The locality draws its name from Chaquelem, one of the 13 villages in the vicinity of Marol that converted to Catholicsm in 1588 after the advent of the Portuguese on Salsette Island.

Chakala is one of the most prominent industrial localities in Mumbai. Chakala also is home to many other small scale businesses and has proximal airport access.

Nepal Airlines has its Mumbai office in the Rathour House in Chakala.

Schools and Colleges
The following are the educational institutions located at Chakala:
 Guru Nanak Mission High School

Religious Institutions
The following is a list of churches and temples in Chakala:
 Gurdwara Guru Nanak Punjabi Sabha Chakala
 Holy Family Church

References

References
Irfca.org
Mumbai Mirror, 25 Oct 2005, Manoj R Nair

Andheri